Blauer is a surname. Notable people with the surname include:

Harold Blauer (1910–1953), American tennis player and Project MKUltra experiment subject
Rosalind Blauer (1943–1973), Canadian economist

See also
Lauer

German-language surnames